Fedora Records is a blues-oriented record label launched by producer Joe Fields as a sister label to HighNote Records in the late 1990s. Artist who've recorded on the label include Tommy Bankhead, Homesick James, and Fillmore Slim.

Roster 
List of artists that have recorded for Fedora include:

 Tommy Bankhead
 Big Al Dupree
 Homesick James
 Iceman Robinson
 Robert 'Bilbo' Walker
 UP Wilson
 Johnnie Bassett
 Fillmore Slim
 Hosea Leavy
 Matthew Robinson
 Ollie Watkins
 Mojo Buford
 Al Garrett
 JJ Malone
 Bennie Smith
 John Weston
 Little Buster
 Hosea Hargrove
 Pig In a Can
 Byther Smith
 Arthur Williams
 Jimmy Dawkins
 Harmonica Slim
 Dave Riley
 Jesse Thomas
 Willie Willis

Sister label 
HighNote Records, founded in 1997

References

External links 
 Official website

American independent record labels
Companies based in New York (state)
Blues record labels
Rhythm and blues record labels